"I Saw the Light" is a song written by Andrew Gold and Lisa Angelle, and recorded by American country music artist Wynonna. It was released in May 1992 as the second single from Wynonna's self-titled debut album, and was also the album's second Number One hit on the Billboard Hot Country Singles & Tracks (now Hot Country Songs) charts. It was also ranked by Billboard as the Number One country hit for 1992.

Content
The narrator of the song discovers her lover is cheating on her when she peeks through the windows of his house and sees him romancing another woman, and afterward announces that she is leaving him.

Personnel
The following musicians performed on this track:
Eddie Bayers – drums
Andrew Gold – background vocals
Wynonna Judd – lead vocals
Steve Nathan – keyboards
Don Potter – acoustic guitar
Matt Rollings – keyboards
Steuart Smith – electric guitar
Willie Weeks – bass guitar

Chart performance

Year-end charts

Lisa Stanley version

 
Irish singer Lisa Stanley released a cover of the song in 2013 under the name 'I Saw The Light In Your Window Tonight'. A music video was also produced the same year by producer Seamus O'Donnell. It was released October 20, 2013 in the United Kingdom. The song was later featured on her 2018 album 'Heart and Soul'. The album peaked at number 11 on the iTunes charts for country music.

References

1992 singles
Wynonna Judd songs
Billboard Hot Country Songs number-one singles of the year
Songs written by Andrew Gold
Song recordings produced by Tony Brown (record producer)
Songs about infidelity
MCA Records singles
Curb Records singles
1992 songs
Songs written by Lisa Angelle